Hermenegild Jireček, Ritter von Samokov (13 April 1827 – 29 December 1909), Bohemian jurisconsult, who was born at Vysoké Mýto (then part of the Austrian Empire), was an official in the Prague bureau of education.

Among his important works on Slavonic law were Codex juris bohemici (11 parts, 1867–1892), and a Collection of Slav Folk-Law (Czech, 1880), Slav Law in Bohemia and Moravia down to the 19th Century (Czech, 3 vols. 1863–1873).

His brother Josef Jireček was also a noted scholar.

References 
 
 

19th-century Czech people
Czech jurists
Bohemian nobility
People from Vysoké Mýto
1827 births
1909 deaths